Universal Lodge No. 14  is a historic building located in Annapolis, Anne Arundel County, Maryland. It was constructed about 1880 as a private dwelling, and substantially expanded in the mid-1950s.  It is a two-story gable-front frame and concrete-block building with a brick veneer facade and a gable finished in stucco. It was listed on the National Register of Historic Places in 2008.

The Prince Hall Masonic Lodge for which it is named was founded in 1865 by a group of African American civilian employees of the U.S. Naval Academy. The lodge purchased the building in the 1940s, and substantially renovated it for use as a meeting hall over the next decade.

In 2019 a $200,000 grant was secured to repair the exterior of the building.

References

External links
 at Maryland Historical Trust

Clubhouses on the National Register of Historic Places in Maryland
Buildings and structures in Annapolis, Maryland
African-American history in Annapolis, Maryland
Masonic buildings in Maryland
Masonic buildings completed in 1880
National Register of Historic Places in Annapolis, Maryland